Windows-1251 is an 8-bit character encoding, designed to cover languages that use the Cyrillic script such as Russian, Ukrainian, Belarusian, Bulgarian, Serbian Cyrillic, Macedonian and other languages.

On the web, it is the second most-used single-byte character encoding (or third most-used character encoding overall), and most used of the single-byte encodings supporting Cyrillic. , 0.4% of all websites use Windows-1251. It's by far mostly used for Russian, while a small minority of Russian websites use it, with 93.7% of Russian (.ru) websites using UTF-8, and the legacy 8-bit encoding is distant second. In Linux, the encoding is known as cp1251.  IBM uses code page 1251 (CCSID 1251 and euro sign extended CCSID 5347) for Windows-1251.

Windows-1251 and KOI8-R (or its Ukrainian variant KOI8-U) are much more commonly used than ISO 8859-5 (which is used by less than 0.0004% of websites). In contrast to Windows-1252 and ISO 8859-1, Windows-1251 is not closely related to ISO 8859-5.

Unicode (e.g. UTF-8) is preferred to Windows-1251 or other Cyrillic encodings in modern applications, especially on the Internet, making UTF-8 the dominant encoding for web pages. (For further discussion of Unicode's complete coverage, of 436 Cyrillic letters/code points, including for Old Cyrillic, and how single-byte character encodings, such as Windows-1251 and KOI8-R, cannot provide this, see Cyrillic script in Unicode.)

Character set
The following table shows Windows-1251. Each character is shown with its Unicode equivalent and its Alt code.

Kazakh variant
An altered version of Windows-1251 was standardised in Kazakhstan as Kazakh standard STRK1048, and is known by the label . It differs in the rows shown below:

Amiga variant

Russian Amiga OS systems used a version of code page 1251 which matches Windows-1251 for the Russian subset of the Cyrillic letters, but otherwise mostly follows ISO-8859-1. This version is known as Amiga-1251, under which name it is registered with the IANA.

See also
 Latin script in Unicode
 Unicode
 Universal Character Set
 European  Unicode subset (DIN 91379) 
 UTF-8

References

Further reading

External links
Windows 1251 reference chart
IANA Charset Name Registration
Unicode mappings of windows 1251 with "best fit"
Universal Cyrillic decoder, an online program that may help recovering unreadable Cyrillic texts with broken Windows-1251 or other character encodings.

Windows code pages